Alfred David Simpson  (born March 19, 1910 - September 11, 1965) was a politician in Ontario, Canada. He served as Mayor of Stratford, Ontario when the Stratford Shakespeare Festival was founded in 1952-53 and encouraged Tom Patterson to pursue the idea further.

References

External links 
 http://www.heritagetrust.on.ca/CMSImages/d0/d0e3fe3d-9b00-4f6a-8d33-9fa2c787d793.pdf
 http://www.stratfordcanada.ca/en/livehere/cemetery.asp

1910 births
1965 deaths
Mayors of Stratford, Ontario